Jibiya  is a   Palestinian village in the Ramallah and al-Bireh Governorate.

Location
It is bordered by  Burham  to the east, Umm Safa the east, north and west,  and Kobar to the west and south.

History
Pottery sherds from the Hellenistic,  Byzantine, and the  Umayyad/Abbasid eras have been found here.

It has been suggested that this was Geba in the Onomasticon,  and the  Crusader place called Gebea, but both these identifications have  now been discarded.

Pottery sherds from the Mamluk era have also been found here.

Ottoman era
Pottery sherds from the early Ottoman era have  been found here. In the spring of 1697, Henry Maundrell noted two "Arab villages," first  "Geeb" and then "Selwid," both on the west side of the road on the way south from Nablus to Jerusalem. Edward Robinson identified these two villages as Jibiya and Silwad.

In 1838 Jibia  was noted as a Muslim village the Beni Zaid district, north of Jerusalem.

In 1863 Victor Guérin noted it as a small village, with a shrine, dedicated to a Sheikh Baiezed.
An official Ottoman village list from about 1870, listed Dschibija as having 12 houses and a  population of 39, though the population count included men, only.

In 1882 the PEF's Survey of Western Palestine (SWP) described  Jibia as "a small village  on high ground, with olives below."

In 1896 the population of Dschibja was estimated to be about 84 persons.

British Mandate era
In the 1922 census of Palestine conducted by the British Mandate authorities, Jebia had a population of 62 Muslims,  increasing slightly in the  1931 census  to 63, in 17 houses.

In 1945 statistics, the population was 90, all Muslims, while the total land area was 1,666  dunams, according to an official land and population survey. Of  this,  100  were  plantations and irrigable land, 815 for cereals, while 4 dunams were classified as built-up areas.

Jordanian era
In the wake of the 1948 Arab–Israeli War, and after the 1949 Armistice Agreements,   Jibiya   came  under Jordanian rule.

Post-1967
Since the Six-Day War in 1967,   Jibiya  has been under Israeli occupation.

After  the 1995 accords, 51.4% of  village land is defined as  Area B land, while the remaining 48.6% is defined as Area C. Israel has confiscated land from Jibiya in order to construct Israeli bypass roads 4 and 566, to Israeli settlements.

References

Bibliography

 
 
  
  

 
 (p. 30)

External links 
Welcome To Jibyya
Survey of Western Palestine, Map 14:   IAA, Wikimedia commons 
Jibiya Village (Fact Sheet),   Applied Research Institute–Jerusalem,  ARIJ
  Jibiya Village Profile, ARIJ
Jibiya aerial photo, ARIJ
Locality Development Priorities and Needs in Jibiya Village, ARIJ

Ramallah and al-Bireh Governorate
Municipalities of the State of Palestine